Bernard Kelly may refer to:

 Bernard Kelly (Irish politician) (1808–1887), Irish nationalist politician 
 Bernard Kelly (American politician) (1823–?), American politician from New York
 Bernard Matthew Kelly (1918–2006), Roman Catholic bishop
 Bernard Philip Kelly (1907–1958), English Catholic philosopher
 Bernard Kelly (footballer) (born 1928), English footballer

See also 
 Bernie Kelly (disambiguation)